Timothée Hal Chalamet (born December 27, 1995) is an American actor. He has received various accolades, including nominations for an Academy Award, two Golden Globe Awards, and three BAFTA Film Awards.

Chalamet began his career as a teenager in television productions, appearing in the drama series Homeland in 2012. In 2014 he made his film debut in the comedy-drama Men, Women & Children and appeared in Christopher Nolan's science fiction film Interstellar. Chalamet came to international attention with the lead role of a lovestruck teenager in Luca Guadagnino's coming-of-age film Call Me by Your Name (2017), earning him a nomination for the Academy Award for Best Actor. Alongside supporting roles in Greta Gerwig's films Lady Bird (2017) and Little Women (2019), he took on starring roles as drug addict Nic Sheff in the drama Beautiful Boy (2018), Paul Atreides in Denis Villeneuve's science fiction film Dune (2021), and a young cannibal in Guadagnino's romantic horror film Bones and All (2022), which he also produced.

On stage, Chalamet starred in John Patrick Shanley's autobiographical play Prodigal Son in 2016, for which he won a Lucille Lortel Award and gained a nomination for a Drama League Award. Off-screen, he has been labeled as a sex symbol and a fashion icon.

Early life and education
Timothée Hal Chalamet was born on December 27, 1995, in New York City, and grew up in the federally subsidized artists' building Manhattan Plaza in Hell's Kitchen. He has an older sister, Pauline Chalamet, who is an actress. His mother, Nicole Flender, is a third-generation New Yorker, of half Russian Jewish and half Austrian Jewish descent. She is a real estate broker at The Corcoran Group, and a former Broadway dancer; Flender earned her bachelor's degree in French from Yale University, and has been a language and dance teacher. His French father, Marc Chalamet, is an editor for the United Nations Children's Emergency Fund (UNICEF) and former New York correspondent for Le Parisien. Marc is from Nîmes and is of a Protestant Christian background. Timothée's paternal grandmother, who had moved to France, was originally Canadian. On his mother's side, he is a nephew of husband-and-wife filmmakers and producers Rodman Flender and Amy Lippman.

Chalamet is bilingual in English and French, and holds dual United States and French citizenship, due to his French father. Growing up, Chalamet spent summers in Le Chambon-sur-Lignon, a small French village two hours away from Lyon, at the home of his paternal grandparents. He stated that his time in France led to cross-cultural identity issues.
Chalamet attended PS 87 William T. Sherman School for elementary school, and later the selective Delta program at MS 54 Booker T. Washington Middle School, which he described as miserable due to the lack of a creative outlet within the school's academically rigorous environment. Heath Ledger's performance in The Dark Knight (2008) inspired him to establish a career in acting. He applied to Fiorello H. LaGuardia High School of Music & Art and Performing Arts. His acceptance into the school was a turning point in his appreciation for acting. Harry Shifman, his sophomore-year drama teacher at LaGuardia, was so impressed by his audition that he insisted on Chalamet's acceptance into the school even though he had been rejected in the interview (due to his middle school record), saying "I gave him the highest score I've ever given a kid auditioning." During high school, Chalamet dated Madonna's daughter Lourdes ("Lola") Leon, a fellow student, for a year. He starred in school musicals as Emcee in Cabaret and Oscar Lindquist in Sweet Charity, graduating in 2013. He is also a YoungArts alumnus.

After high school, Chalamet, then 17, attended Columbia University for one year, majoring in cultural anthropology, and was a resident of Hartley Hall. He later transferred to New York University's Gallatin School of Individualized Study to pursue his acting career more freely, having found it difficult to assimilate to Columbia directly after filming Interstellar. Upon leaving Columbia, Chalamet moved to Concourse, Bronx.

Career

Early roles (2008–2016)

As a child, Chalamet appeared in several commercials and acted in two horror short films called Sweet Tooth and Clown before making his television debut on an episode of the long-running police procedural series Law & Order (2009), playing a murder victim. He followed this with a minor role in the television film Loving Leah (2009). In 2011, he made his stage debut in the Off-Broadway play The Talls, a coming-of-age comedy set in the 1970s, in which he played a sexually curious 12-year-old. The chief theatre critic of New York Daily News wrote, "Chalamet hilariously captures a tween's awakening curiosities about sex." In 2012, he had recurring roles in the drama series Royal Pains and the thriller series Homeland, in which he played Finn Walden, the rebellious son of the Vice President. Along with the rest of the cast, Chalamet was nominated for a SAG Award for Best Ensemble.

In 2014, Chalamet made his feature film debut in a minor role in Jason Reitman's Men, Women & Children. In the same year, he played the role of Tom Cooper, the son of Matthew McConaughey's character, in Christopher Nolan's Interstellar. The film received positive reviews, with critics praising the cast's performances, and grossed over $700 million worldwide. Also in 2014, Chalamet had a supporting role in Worst Friends, a comedy which had a limited theatrical release and received positive reviews. In the next year, Chalamet co-starred in Andrew Droz Palermo's fantasy thriller One & Two, which premiered at the Berlin International Film Festival, where it received mixed reviews, before its limited theatrical release. His next role was playing the teenage version of James Franco's character, Stephen Elliott, in Pamela Romanowsky's The Adderall Diaries. In his final role of 2015, Chalamet played Charlie Cooper, the sullen grandson of Diane Keaton and John Goodman's characters in the Christmas comedy Love the Coopers, which received negative reviews.

In 2016, Chalamet starred as Jim Quinn in the autobiographical play Prodigal Son at Manhattan Theatre Club. Handpicked by its playwright and director John Patrick Shanley and producer Scott Rudin, Chalamet portrayed a younger Shanley, a misfit Bronx kid in a prestigious New Hampshire prep school set in 1963. His performance was praised and won him the Lucille Lortel Award for Outstanding Lead Actor in a Play, in addition to a nomination for the Drama League Award for Distinguished Performance. Chalamet also co-starred opposite Lily Rabe in Julia Hart's Miss Stevens as the troubled student Billy Mitman. Stephen Farber of The Hollywood Reporter described Chalamet's act as "compelling" and "startling", with his character's speech from Death of a Salesman as among the best he has ever seen. Stephen Holden of The New York Times compared him to James Dean.

Breakthrough and rise to prominence (2017–2020)

After being attached to the project for three years, Chalamet starred in Luca Guadagnino's Call Me by Your Name, based on the novel of the same name, by André Aciman. The story revolves around Elio Perlman, a young man living in Italy during the 1980s, who falls in love with Oliver (Armie Hammer), a university student who has come to stay with his family. In preparation, Chalamet learned to speak Italian, as well as to play the piano and guitar. Call Me by Your Name premiered at the 2017 Sundance Film Festival to critical acclaim; critics particularly highlighted Chalamet's performance. Olly Richards of Empire wrote, "In a film in which every performance is terrific, Chalamet makes the rest look like they're acting. He alone would make the film worth watching". Jon Frosch of The Hollywood Reporter stated that no performance during the year "felt as emotionally, physically and intellectually alive" and included Chalamet in the magazine's list of the best performances of the year. Time and The New York Times also featured him in such lists. He won the Gotham Independent Film Award for Breakthrough Actor and the Independent Spirit Award for Best Male Lead, and received nominations for the Critics' Choice Movie Award, Golden Globe Award, SAG Award, BAFTA Award, and Academy Award, all for Best Actor. He is the third-youngest person to be nominated for an Academy Award for Best Actor as well as the youngest since 19-year-old Mickey Rooney in Babes in Arms in 1939.

In his second film of 2017, Chalamet played Daniel, a gawky teenager who gets swept up in the drug-dealing business over the course of a summer, in Elijah Bynum's directorial debut, Hot Summer Nights. It received a limited theatrical release in 2018 and generated mixed reviews from critics, though Chalamet received praise from K. Austin Collins of Vanity Fair, who called the "sensitivity" in his performance "something special". Later that year, he played Kyle Scheible, a rich hipster in a band and a love interest of Saoirse Ronan's character in Lady Bird, the solo directorial debut of Greta Gerwig. Critics praised the ensemble cast, with Ty Burr of The Boston Globe taking particular note of Chalamet's "hilarious" performance. In his final film of 2017, Scott Cooper's western Hostiles, Chalamet played a young soldier named Philippe DeJardin, alongside Christian Bale.

In 2018, Chalamet joined the Academy of Motion Picture Arts and Sciences. Later that year, Chalamet portrayed Nic Sheff, a teenager addicted to methamphetamine who shares a strained relationship with his father, the journalist David Sheff (portrayed by Steve Carell), in the drama Beautiful Boy. Directed by Felix Van Groeningen, the film is based on a pair of memoirs—the elder Sheff's memoir of the same name and Tweak: Growing Up on Methamphetamines by Nic Sheff. Owen Glieberman of Variety drew comparisons with Chalamet's performance in Call Me by Your Name, stating that "Nic, in his muffled millennial James Dean way, [as] skittery and self-involved" is a transformation from the "marvelous directness" he displayed in the role of Elio Perlman. He received nominations for Best Supporting Actor at the Golden Globe, SAG, and BAFTA award ceremonies.

The following year, Chalamet starred in Woody Allen's romantic comedy A Rainy Day in New York. The Me Too movement prompted a resurgence of the 1992 sexual abuse allegation against Allen. Chalamet said he was unable to answer questions about working with Allen due to his contractual obligations; the Huffington Post obtained a copy of Chalamet's contract which disputed this. Chalamet donated his salary to the charities Time's Up, LGBT Center of New York, and RAINN, and did not promote the film. Allen claimed in his 2020 memoir Apropos of Nothing that Chalamet told Allen's sister Letty Aronson that he only denounced him in an attempt to improve his chances of winning an Academy Award for Call Me by Your Name. Chalamet next portrayed Henry V of England, a young prince who unwittingly ascends the English Throne, in David Michôd's Netflix period drama The King, based on several plays from Shakespeare's Henriad. Richard Lawson of Vanity Fair wrote, "Chalamet does robust work, straightening his lanky posture as he goes, rising up into the role like a man ascendant". In his third film release of 2019, Chalamet portrayed Theodore "Laurie" Laurence, a lovestruck teenager, in Little Women, an adaptation of Louisa May Alcott's novel of the same name. Marking his second collaboration with Gerwig and Ronan, the film was acclaimed by critics, two of whomPeter Travers of Rolling Stone and Ann Hornaday of The Washington Postalso praised Chalamet's performance; with Travers noting that the actor portrays the role with "innate charm and poignant vulnerability," while Hornaday highlighted his "languidly graceful" performance and its "playful physicality." Chalamet hosted an episode of the sketch comedy series Saturday Night Live in 2020.

Established actor (2021–present)
In 2021, Chalamet portrayed a student revolutionary in Wes Anderson's ensemble comedy-drama The French Dispatch. The film had its world premiere at the 2021 Cannes Film Festival, where it generated positive reviews. Anderson wrote the role with Chalamet in mind. Brianna Zigler of Paste Magazine found him to be "perfectly attuned to Anderson's highly specified wavelength". Chalamet starred as the main character Paul Atreides in Denis Villeneuve's film adaptation of the science fiction novel Dune, which premiered at the 78th Venice International Film Festival. Villeneuve stated that Chalamet was his only choice to play the role: "I needed that for the audience to believe this young man will be able to lead a whole planet." Dune received positive reviews with The Hollywood Reporters David Rooney praising his "magnetic pensiveness [that] gives the coming-of-age element some heart" and Lewis Knight of Daily Mirror writing that "Timothée Chalamet completes his ascension to Hollywood leading man status". Dune earned over $400 million worldwide to emerge as his highest-grossing release. In his final role of the year, Chalamet played a skater punk in Adam McKay's Netflix ensemble comedy film Don't Look Up. It received mixed reviews from critics. Justin Chang of the Los Angeles Times found Chalamet "sweetly sincere" in his small part. The ensemble cast of the film was nominated for a SAG Award.

Chalamet reunited with Guadagnino in the road film Bones and All (2022), in which he starred alongside Taylor Russell as cannibal drifters. The project marked his first production venture, and he credited Guadagnino for mentoring him through the process. Bones and All premiered at the 79th Venice International Film Festival. Leila Latif of IndieWire praised the chemistry between Chalamet and Russell and took note of his "near-peerless ability to gently weep", and Jon Frosch of The Hollywood Reporter added that "Chalamet reminded us why he’s the best actor of his generation". That same year, he lent his voice to the Netflix adult animated musical special Entergalactic.

Chalamet will next reprise the role of Paul Atreides in the sequel to Dune, titled Dune: Part Two, and play Willy Wonka in the musical film Wonka, directed by Paul King.

Public image and fashion

Several media publications consider Chalamet to be among the most talented actors of his generation. Remarking upon his performance in Beautiful Boy, Kenneth Turan of the Los Angeles Times wrote that "he might be the male actor of his generation". In 2018, he appeared in Forbess 30 Under 30 Hollywood & Entertainment list.

Chalamet has been described by the media as a sex symbol and a fashion icon, with his hair, jawline, and androgynous looks highlighted as his trademarks. Vogue named him the most influential man in fashion in 2019, and credits him for continuing "to ply the boundary between traditional masculinity and femininity", writing "those fashion choices are all the more impressive considering that Chalamet styles himself". In 2020, GQ ranked him as the best-dressed man in the world. 

Chalamet served as one of the co-chairs of the 2021 Met Gala alongside singer Billie Eilish, professional tennis player Naomi Osaka, and poet Amanda Gorman. The event was part of the Costume Institute's exhibit In America: A Lexicon of Fashion. In September 2021, Chalamet became a brand ambassador for Cartier. In December 2021, Chalamet, alongside close collaborator Haider Ackermann, designed a hoodie with 100% of the proceeds going to French organization Afghanistan Libre, which is centered around preserving the rights of women in Afghanistan.
At the 94th Academy Awards, Chalamet wore a sequined Louis Vuitton jacket from Nicolas Ghesquière's womenswear collection without a shirt; W declared that he had "rewritten the gentleman's Oscar dress code for good", highlighting the boundary-pushing outfit that "blurred the lines of fashion's traditional gender divide". In 2022, Chalamet appeared on the cover of the October print edition of British Vogue, becoming the first solo male to do so in the magazine's history.

Personal life 
Chalamet splits his time between New York and California. Despite significant media attention and public interest, he rarely discusses his personal life.

Chalamet is an avid sports fan; in his youth, he aspired to be a professional soccer player. He is a lifelong supporter of the New York Knicks and the French soccer team AS Saint-Étienne. He enjoys hip-hop music and considers rapper Kid Cudi to be his biggest career inspiration.

Filmography

Film

Television

Theater

Awards and nominations 

Chalamet was nominated for the Academy Award for Best Actor for his performance in Call Me by Your Name. He was also nominated for a BAFTA Award, a Golden Globe Award, a Screen Actors Guild Award, and a Critics' Choice Movie Award, all for Best Actor. During the same awards season, Chalamet gained recognition for his supporting role in Lady Bird, receiving nominations for the Critics' Choice Movie Award for Best Acting Ensemble and the Screen Actors Guild Award for Outstanding Performance by a Cast in a Motion Picture along with the rest of the cast. For his work in Beautiful Boy, he was nominated for a Golden Globe Award, a BAFTA Award, a Screen Actors Guild Award, and a Critics' Choice Award, all for Best Supporting Actor.

Notes

References

External links

 

1995 births
21st-century American Jews
21st-century American male actors
21st-century French male actors
American Ashkenazi Jews
American male child actors
American male film actors
American male stage actors
American male television actors
American male voice actors
American people of Austrian-Jewish descent
American people of Canadian descent
American people of French descent
American people of Russian-Jewish descent
Columbia College (New York) alumni
Fiorello H. LaGuardia High School alumni
French people of Austrian-Jewish descent
French people of Canadian descent
French people of Russian-Jewish descent
Independent Spirit Award for Best Male Lead winners
Jewish American male actors
Living people
Male actors from New York City
New York University Gallatin School of Individualized Study alumni
People from Hell's Kitchen, Manhattan
People from the Bronx